The 2012–13 Big Bash League season or BBL|02 was the second season of the Big Bash League, the premier Twenty20 cricket competition in Australia. The tournament began on 7 December 2012, with the final being held on 19 January 2013.

The defending champions, Sydney Sixers were knocked out in the group stage. Melbourne Renegades finished first in the group stage with 7 wins and a loss. Perth Scorchers, Melbourne Stars and Brisbane Heat were the other teams to reach the semi-finals.

In the first semi-final, Brisbane Heat defeated Melbourne Renegades by 15 runs to make it to the finals of the Big Bash League for the first time. In the other semi-final, Perth Scorchers defeated Melbourne Stars by 8 wickets in a rain curtailed match to make it to the finals for the second time in a row. Melbourne Stars failed to advance to the final for the second successive year.

In the final, Brisbane Heat beat Perth Scorchers by 34 runs to lift their first Big Bash League title. Perth Scorchers finished runners-up for the second successive year.

Aaron Finch of Melbourne Renegades was named Player of the tournament for scoring 332 runs in the tournament including an unbeaten century. Shaun Marsh of Perth Scorchers finished as the leading run-getter of the tournament as he amassed 412 runs in 9 innings. Ben Laughlin of Hobart Hurricanes was the leading wicket-taker of the tournament. He took 14 wickets in 8 matches.

The highest individual score of the tournament was 112* by Luke Pomersbach of Brisbane Heat in the semi-final game against Melbourne Renegades. Lasith Malinga took the best bowling figures of the tournament, capturing 6 wickets for 7 runs for Melbourne Stars against Perth Scorchers. This was the best bowling figures in Twenty20 cricket of Malinga's career and also the best bowling in a Twenty20 game on Australian soil.

The two finalists, Perth Scorchers and Brisbane Heat qualified for the 2013 Champions League Twenty20.

Points table

Format
This season featured the same number of teams as the previous season but included a new format with an expanded group stage. This new format consists of 35 matches. The new group stage has each team play eight matches, two of which are against the same team. The four best performing teams from the group stage advance to the knockout stage.

The rules for the tournament deviate from those in the laws of cricket where any no-ball will be followed by a free hit.

Signings
The official Player Signing Window opened on 9 July 2012 and closed on 20 July 2012. Each team had a salary cap of A$1 million and could sign up to a maximum of 18 players, but no fewer than 14, including two international players. The minimum playing contract was set at A$20,000.

Unlike the 2011/12 inaugural season, Cricket Australia decided that each player had the opportunity to sign multi-year deals with the contract window opening on 9 July 2012 and ending on 20 July.

League progression

Results

Group stage

Knockout stage

Fixtures
Times shown are in Australian Western Standard Time (UTC+08) for Perth, Australian Central Daylight Time (UTC+10:30) for Adelaide, Australian Eastern Standard Time (UTC+10:00) for Brisbane and Australian Eastern Daylight Time (UTC+11:00) for all remaining venues.

Group stage

Knockout phase

Statistics

Highest team totals
The following table lists the five highest team scores during this season.

Last Updated 15 January 2013.

Most runs
The top five highest run scorers (total runs) in the season are included in this table.

Last Updated 19 January 2013.

Highest individual scores
This table contains the top five highest scores of the season made by a batsman in a single innings.

Last Updated 15 January 2013.

Most wickets
The following table contains the five leading wicket-takers of the season.

Last Updated 19 January 2013.

Best bowling figures
This table lists the top five players with the best bowling figures in the season.

Last Updated 4 January 2013.

Hat-tricks
This table lists the hat-tricks taken in the season.

References

External links 
Official fixtures
Tournament site on ESPN Cricinfo
Attendance figures and records BigBash.com.au

Big Bash League seasons
Big Bash League
Big Bash League